"Doctor! Doctor!" is a song performed by the British new wave band Thompson Twins. It is the second single from the band's fourth studio album, Into the Gap (1984). It was written by Tom Bailey, Alannah Currie and Joe Leeway, and prominently features a keyboard solo. Following the successful chart performances of the Into the Gap single "Hold Me Now", "Doctor! Doctor!" was released in the UK on 27 January 1984 as the album's second single.

Background and recording
In 1983, after the commercial success of their third album Quick Step and Side Kick, the Thompson Twins collaborated again with producer Alex Sadkin to record Into the Gap at Compass Point Studios in the Bahamas. Bailey and Sadkin co-produced the album's tracks, including "Doctor! Doctor!".

Release
The single peaked at #3 in the United Kingdom and #11 in the United States in July 1984. The song also peaked at #18 on the US Dance chart in the same year, and the Top 20 in Canada, Germany, Switzerland, New Zealand, Australia and South Africa.

Sleeve photography was by Peter Ashworth.

Music video

The promotional music video was directed by Dieter 'Dee' Trattmann. It was released in 1984 and received heavy rotation on MTV.

The video opens on a scene of darkness, shifting clouds and a rising moon. Electronic music begins to play. A keyboard with hands playing superimposes over the silhouette of blocks like buildings. People appear against the backdrop of moon and clouds with a couple on ice skates just behind Tom Bailey as he begins to sing. The scene shifts quickly to a woman standing alone (Alannah Currie), then to Currie playing drums and Joe Leeway playing keyboard. As Bailey sings, the characters behind him act out the lyrics, intercut with shots of the band playing their instruments. As the song continues, Bailey, Currie and Leeway join the characters to act out the lyrics around blocks emitting smoke. The skaters and actors perform during the synthesizer solo. The scene continues to shift between the singer, the band playing, the actors and the ice skaters moving and turning. The video fades out in the same sequence it began, changing from the characters to the blocks against the sky, and then to the distant moon and shifting clouds.

An alternative edit of the video features more of the band playing instruments (e.g., Currie playing percussion and Bailey playing the synthesizer while the ice skaters dance) and less interaction with the other characters.

Track listing
 12" Single (601 182)
"Doctor! Doctor! (Extended Version)" - 7:50
"Nurse Shark" - 4:05

 7" Single Arista (ARI 8366)
"Doctor! Doctor!" - 4:30  
"Nurse Shark" - 4:07

 7" Promo Single Arista (AS 1-9209)
"Doctor! Doctor!(Short Edit)" -3:46
"Doctor! Doctor!"-4:29

Official versions
 Promo Version -3:46
 Album Version – 4:39
 Extended Version – 7:50
 Live from Thompson Twins Live - 5:53
 Introduction sample (from The Thompson Twins Adventure) - 0:50

Charts and certifications

Weekly charts

Year-end charts

Certifications

See also
 1984 in British music

References

External links
 Official music video
 Alternate edit of official music video
 

1984 singles
Thompson Twins songs
Songs written by Tom Bailey (musician)
Songs written by Alannah Currie
1984 songs
Songs written by Joe Leeway
Arista Records singles